Association Sportive Mataiea is a football club from Teva I Uta, Tahiti. It currently competes in the Tahiti Ligue 1 after being promoted from Ligue 2 in 2019–20. The last time the team played in the Tahitian top division was the 2000–01 season.

Last seasons

Current squad
Squad for the 2020–21 Tahiti Ligue 1

References

Football clubs in Tahiti
Football clubs in French Polynesia